South Leicester Rugby Football Club is an English rugby union team based in Wigston, Leicestershire - just south of Leicester. The club runs two senior sides, plus a colts side and a full set of junior teams. The first XV were playing in the Midlands Premier, the fifth tier of the English rugby union system, following their relegation from National League 2 North at the end of the 2018–19 season, however, due to a run of bad results and a number of players leaving the club, they have withdrawn from the Midlands Premier.

History
South Leicester Rugby Club was formed in 1919. A history of the early years of the club can be found on the club's website

Honours
 Leicestershire 1 champions: 1991–92
 Leicestershire County Cup winners (7): 2001–02, 2007–08, 2008–09, 2010–11, 2011–12, 2013–14, 2014–15
 Midlands 3 East (South) champions: 2001–02
 Midlands Division 2 East champions: 2005–06
 National League 3 Midlands champions: 2014–15

References

External links
 Official club website

English rugby union teams
Rugby clubs established in 1919
Sport in Leicester
Rugby union clubs in Leicestershire